Susan MacLaury is the co-founder and executive director of the non-profit media company Shine Global, a licensed social worker, and a retired educator.  She is also an Emmy-winning and Academy Award-nominated producer.

Career
MacLaury was a full-time Associate Professor of Health Education at Kean University from 1994 through 2014.

In 2005, MacLaury and her husband Albie Hecht founded Shine Global, a non-profit media company with the mission to give voice to children by telling stories of their resilience to raise awareness, promote action, and inspire change. MacLaury won an Emmy and was nominated for an Oscar for her work as executive producer of the 2007 documentary War/Dance. War/Dance won best documentary and best cinematography at the 31st News & Documentary Emmy Awards in 2010.  She is also the Executive Producer of several other films including The Harvest (2010 film) with Executive Producer Eva Longoria, the Academy Award winning short documentary Inocente, and the 3D documentary 1 Way Up.

References

Living people
Kean University faculty
American film producers
Year of birth missing (living people)